Silt'e (also transliterated Silte) can refer to:

 Silt'e people of Ethiopia;
 Silt'e language, which they speak;
 Silte Zone, where most live; 
 Silte (woreda), a subunit of where they live.

Language and nationality disambiguation pages